Travis Homer (born August 7, 1998) is an American football running back for the Chicago Bears of the National Football League (NFL). He played college football at Miami (FL).

Early years
Homer attended Oxbridge Academy in West Palm Beach, Florida. During his high school football career, he had over 3,200 rushing yards and 50 total touchdowns. He committed to the University of Miami to play college football.

College career
As a true freshman at Miami in 2016, Homer played in 12 games, rushing for 44 yards on seven carries. As a sophomore in 2017, he appeared in 13 games and started the final nine. He finished the season with 966 rushing yards on 163 carries with eight touchdowns. As a junior in 2018, he had 164 carries for 985 yards and four touchdowns. After the season, he entered the 2019 NFL Draft.

Collegiate statistics

Professional career

Seattle Seahawks
Homer was drafted by the Seattle Seahawks in the sixth round (204th overall) of the 2019 NFL Draft. His first career carry came on December 2, 2019, during Monday Night Football against the Minnesota Vikings, where he was snapped the ball on a fake punt and ran 29 yards for a first down.
Homer made his first career start in Week 17 against the San Francisco 49ers after starting running backs Chris Carson and Rashaad Penny suffered season ending injuries during the previous two games. During the game, Homer rushed 10 times for 62 yards and caught five passes for 30 yards in the 26–21 loss. 

Homer entered the 2020 season third on the running back depth chart. He was placed on injured reserve on December 19, 2020.

In Week 8 of the 2021 season against the Jacksonville Jaguars, Homer recovered an onside kick with 1:49 left in the game and returned it 44 yards for a touchdown. The Seahawks would win 31–7. This was the first special teams touchdown for the Seahawks since the final week of the 2017 regular season. In Week 13, Homer scored a 73 yard touchdown on a fake punt against the San Francisco 49ers as the Seahawks would go on to win 30-23. He was named NFC Special Teams Player of the Week for his performance.

On September 28, 2022, Homer was placed on injured reserve. He was activated on October 29.

Chicago Bears
On March 15, 2023, Homer signed a two-year contract with the Chicago Bears worth up to $4.5 million.

References

External links
Seattle Seahawks bio
Miami Hurricanes bio

1998 births
Living people
Sportspeople from West Palm Beach, Florida
Players of American football from Florida
American football running backs
Miami Hurricanes football players
Seattle Seahawks players
Chicago Bears players